Shitlist may refer to:

Albums
Shitlist, a 1987 album by Macabre (band)

Songs
"Shitlist," by L7 from their 1992 album Bricks Are Heavy
"Shitlist," by Unit:187 from their 1996 album Unit:187
"Shitlist," by DevilDriver from their 2011 album Beast